Turnerize, Turnerized, Turnerization, and related words can refer to the following:

 Film colorization, named after Ted Turner, an early proponent of the process
 The changes in the rights of prisoners in the United States after the United States Supreme Court case Turner v. Safley,  482 U.S. 78 (1987)
 A synonym for Yellow journalism